Suillus nueschii is a rare species of mushroom in the genus Suillus. A European species, it was first described scientifically by mycologist Rolf Singer in 1962.

References

External links

nueschii
Edible fungi
Fungi of Europe
Fungi described in 1962
Taxa named by Rolf Singer